Grevillea candelabroides is a species of flowering plant in the family Proteaceae and is endemic to the west of Western Australia. It is a shrub with pinnately-divided leaves with linear lobes, and white or cream-coloured flowers.

Description
The lower surface of the leaves have two hairy grooves.

Taxonomy
Grevillea candelabroides was first formally described in 1964 by Charles Gardner in the Journal of the Royal Society of Western Australia from specimens he collected near Ajana. The specific epithet (candelabroides) means "candlestick-like", referring to the arrangement of the flowers.

Distribution and habitat
This grevillea grows in heath or shrubland in sandy soil, from north of Kalbarri to near Coorow, in the Avon Wheatbelt, Geraldton Sandplains and Yalgoo biogeographic regions of Western Australia.

Conservation status
The species is listed as "not threatened" by the Department of Biodiversity, Conservation and Attractions.

References

candelabroides
Eudicots of Western Australia
Proteales of Australia
Plants described in 1964
Taxa named by Charles Gardner